Phaidon is an ancient Greek name that may refer to:
Phaedo of Elis, philosopher
Phaedo, one of Plato's dialogues named after Phaedo of Elis who appears in it
Phaidon Press, a publisher
Phaidon Design Classics, a 2006 British three volume set of reference books on industrial design

See also
Pheidon, king of Argos